Events from the year 1997 in art.

Events
January 27 – It is revealed that French museums have nearly 2,000 pieces of art that had been stolen by Nazis.
February 22 – Gustav Klimt's Portrait of a Lady (overpainted 1917 on Portrait of a Young Lady) is stolen from the Galleria d'arte moderna Ricci Oddi in Piacenza, Italy. It is recovered from a hiding place in the exterior of the building in December 2019.
March 6 – Pablo Picasso's Tête de Femme is stolen from a London gallery. It is recovered a week later.
April 27 – Andrew Cunanan murders Jeffrey Trail, beginning a murder spree that will last until July and end with the murder of fashion designer Gianni Versace.
September 8 – Marcus Harvey's controversial painting of Myra Hindley goes on display at the Royal Academy of Art in London and is vandalised twice, by two different artists, on the opening day.
October 18 – Guggenheim Museum Bilbao, designed by Frank Gehry, is opened.

Full date unknown
Puppy by Jeff Koons is moved from Sydney Harbour to the Guggenheim Museum Bilbao.
Robert Colescott becomes the first African-American to represent the United States in a solo exhibition at the Venice Biennial.
Istanbul Contemporary Art Museum is  established by conceptual artist Genco Gulan in Turkey as an art project.
Patricia Martín conceives La Colección Jumex in Mexico City.

Exhibitions
Sensation opens at the Royal Academy of Art in London.
Kate and Helen Storey's Primitive Streak opens at the Institute of Contemporary Arts in London.
Documenta X opens in Kassel.

Awards
Archibald Prize – Nigel Thomson, Barbara Blackman
 John Moores Painting Prize - Dan Hays for "Harmony in Green"
Schock Prize in Visual Arts – Torsten Andersson
Turner Prize – Gillian Wearing
-The Venice Biennial-
The Lion d'or (Golden Lion) for Lifetime Achievement: Emilio Vedova (Italy), Agnes Martin (USA)
The Lion d'or for Best Pavilion: France exhibiting the work of Fabrice Hyber

Artworks

Matthew Barney - The Erich Weiss Suite
Louise Bourgeois – Eye Benches I, II and III (Seattle)
Maurizio Cattelan – Turisti (installation, first version)
Thornton Dial - The Bridge dedicated to Congressman John Lewis at John Lewis Plaza in Freedom Park in Atlanta, Georgia
Lucian Freud – Eight Months Gone
Zenos Frudakis – Statue of Ellis Arnall (Atlanta)
Antony Gormley – Another Place (sculpture)
Rodney Graham – Vexation Island (film loop)
Philip Jackson 
 Gurkha Memorial, London
 Raoul Wallenberg Monument, London
Larry Kirkland – Garden Wreath (installation, Portland, Oregon)
 Gabriel Koren - El-Hajj Malik Shabazz, Malcolm X placed at the Audobon Ballroom in Manhattan, New York City
Sarah Lucas – Bunny Gets Snookered (installation, including Pauline Bunny)
Ron Mueck – Dead Dad, Angel, Big Baby II and III, Man in a Sheet and Mask (Self Portrait) (sculptures)
Odd NerdrumThe Savior of PaintingSelf-Portrait in Golden CapeCornelia ParkerMass (Colder Darker Matter) (installation)The Negative of Whispers (sculpture of found material)Pornographic DrawingsMartin Puryear – Bearing Witness (sculpture, Washington, D.C.)
Gillian Wearing – 10–16'' (video)

Deaths

January to June
January 23 – Jeremy Maas, English art dealer and historian of Victorian painting (b. 1928).
January 25 – Dan Barry, American cartoonist (b. 1923)
February 2 – Theodoros Stamos, Greek American abstract expressionist painter (b.1922).
March 7 – Martin Kippenberger, German artist (b.1953).
March 11 – Sam Golden, paint maker (b.1915).
March 15 – Victor Vasarely, Hungarian-French artist (b.1906).
March 19 – Willem de Kooning, Dutch born American abstract expressionist painter (b.1904).
April 16 – Roland Topor, French illustrator, painter, writer and filmmaker (b.1938).
April 20 – Jean Louis, French costume designer (b.1907).
April 22 – Reg Gammon, English painter and illustrator (b.1894)
May 23 – James Lee Byars, American artist (b.1932).

July to December
July 15 – Gianni Versace, Italian fashion designer, murdered (b.1946).
July 16 – Dora Maar, French photographer, poet and painter, lover of Pablo Picasso (b.1907).
August 4 – Tom Eckersley, English poster artist (b.1914)
September 6 – Jean-Pierre Sudre, French photographer (b.1921)
September 29 – Roy Lichtenstein, American pop artist (b.1923).
October 22 – Leonid Amalrik, Russian animator and animation director (b.1905).
October 23 – Claire Falkenstein, American sculptor and painter (b.1908).
November 26 - Philip Berman, art collector, philanthropist, and co-founder of the Philip and Muriel Berman Museum at Ursinus College in Collegeville, Pennsylvania (b. 1915
December 16 – Lillian Disney, American artist and wife of Walt Disney (b.1899).

Full date unknown
Jean Pierre Capron, French painter (b.1921).

References

 
Years of the 20th century in art
1990s in art